Ramkhamhaeng University Stadium is a multi-purpose stadium in Bang Kapi District, Bangkok, Thailand. The stadium holds 6,000 people. The stadium has a grass surface.

Football venues in Thailand
Multi-purpose stadiums in Thailand
Sports venues in Bangkok